The 2008 Brands Hatch Superbike World Championship round was the tenth round of the 2008 Superbike World Championship. It took place on the weekend of August 1–3, 2008, at the Brands Hatch circuit. The round was marred by the death of Craig Jones during the Supersport race.

Superbike race 1 classification

Superbike race 2 classification

Supersport race classification

Brands Hatch Round
Brands Hatch